John Mozeliak (born January 18, 1969) is an American baseball executive who is the president of baseball operations of the St. Louis Cardinals of Major League Baseball (MLB). Never a professional baseball player, Mozeliak came to the Cardinals as Walt Jocketty's assistant in 1995 and became the organization's twelfth General Manager after the 2007 season.

The winner of three Executive of the Year awards, Mozeliak has overseen the Cardinals make playoff appearances in six years, win one World Series title, and two National League pennants. They have had a winning record in every season since he was general manager. The Cardinals' minor league farm system has received numerous accolades following the volume of prospects that have succeeded at the major league level, including Baseball America bestowing the franchise with the Organization of the Year Award in 2011 and 2013. Mozeliak is signed through the 2023 season.

Early life and education
Mozeliak attended Fairview High School in Boulder, Colorado. He played for the school's baseball team as a pitcher and first baseman. He also played American Legion baseball. Mozeliak attended the University of Arizona, where he was a member of Phi Delta Theta fraternity, before ultimately graduating from the University of Colorado at Boulder.

Career beginnings (1993–2007)

Colorado Rockies (1993–95)
In 1993, Jay Darnell, the Colorado Rockies' video coordinator, introduced Mozeliak to Bryn Smith, pitcher for the Rockies. Smith was looking for a location to go fly fishing. A few days after Mozeliak took Smith fly fishing, the Rockies invited Mozeliak to serve as a batting practice pitcher, since they needed someone who could throw left handed. Dante Bichette took a liking to Mozeliak, and they created a clubhouse job for Mozeliak. He began to work with Bob Gebhard, the Rockies' general manager (GM), and Walt Jocketty, the assistant GM.

Roles in St. Louis Cardinals' scouting department (1995–2007)
When the St. Louis Cardinals hired Jocketty as their GM in 1995, Mozeliak went to St. Louis as well. He served as an assistant within the scouting department and later spent five seasons as Jocketty's assistant GM. He became the assisting scouting director in 1998. The next season, Mozeliak was promoted to scouting director and oversaw the drafting of talent such as Albert Pujols and Yadier Molina. He garnered much attention as a major up-and-coming GM in the industry and interviewed with the Cincinnati Reds and Houston Astros.

St. Louis Cardinals general manager (2007–2017)
On October 3, 2007, Chairman of the Board of Directors Bill DeWitt announced that the Cardinals "had cordially and respectfully" parted ways with Jocketty based on philosophical differences of player development. DeWitt named Mozeliak the interim GM. Dating back to the year before, tension arose after Jeff Luhnow, later the Astros' GM, was promoted to vice president of amateur scouting and player development. After more than a decade as GM, Luhnow's promotion tacitly signaled he had usurped that sphere of Jocketty's authority.

While other candidates interviewed for the GM position, it appeared Cleveland Indians assistant GM Chris Antonetti was the early favorite. However, Indians ownership improved Antonetti's offer to take over the full GM position and enticed him to stay. On the evening of October 30, 2007, Mozeliak accepted the Cardinals' offer and the team formally introduced him as the new GM the next day.

Early moves (2007–10)
One of Mozeliak's first major moves was to trade iconic center fielder Jim Edmonds to the San Diego Padres for third baseman David Freese on December 15, 2007. Although stating regret at first over trading the popular but often-injured Edmonds, Freese later proved to be integral in the Cardinals' 2011 season.

Matt Holliday
In 2009, Mozeliak acquired slugger Matt Holliday in a trade with the Oakland Athletics and signed him to the richest contract in team history the following January, valued at $116 million. Holliday produced an .874 OPS and an OPS+ of 138 as a Cardinal, compared to 132 for his career. On September 26, the Cardinals clinched their first division title during Mozeliak's tenure as GM against the Colorado Rockies. However, they lost to the Los Angeles Dodgers in the NLDS. When Holliday was a free agent the following offseason, DeWitt became frustrated with agent Scott Boras and walked away from negotiations. However, Mozeliak, who had developed a strong working relationship with DeWitt, persuaded him to sign Holliday for seven years at $17 million per year.

Quest for consistency at shortstop
After Édgar Rentería manned shortstop for the Cardinals from 1999 to 2004, he left for the Boston Red Sox via free agency. The Cardinals found difficulty filling the position. In 2009, a trade involving Mark Worrell and Luke Gregerson brought Khalil Greene from the Padres. With poor performance and a $6.5 million salary, he took time off in May and June. It was revealed that he may have been attempting to inflict injury upon himself, indicative of social anxiety disorder. Greene appeared in 77 games that season, batting just .200 with six home runs and 24 runs batted in. That was the last time he appeared in the major leagues.

Lance Berkman contract
The Cardinals announced that Mozeliak endorsed a new three-year contract extension with the team through 2013 on July 15, 2010. The following offseason, Mozeliak created a stir––even drawing ridicule––for inking 34-year-old Lance Berkman to a one-year, $8 million contract on December 4. Due to his 2010 results of a .248 batting average with 14 home runs and 58 RBIs in 122 games with the Houston Astros and New York Yankees, opinions circulated that he was too old to continue to produce at his former levels.

However, Berkman dramatically improved his physical shape in the offseason. Early the next season, hitting coach Mark McGwire corrected a flaw in Berkman's swing that had been introduced by leg injuries and he responded with a .301 batting average, 31 home runs and 94 RBIs. His 164 OPS+ was the highest of his career and his accolades for the year included an All-Star appearance, the NL Comeback Player of the Year award and seventh place in the MVP voting.

The path to the 2011 World Series

Mozeliak brandished what proved to be the one of the exceptional in-season moves to shape the 2011 season on July 27. He traded the highly regarded but troubled center fielder Colby Rasmus, relievers Trever Miller, P. J. Walters and Brian Tallet to the Toronto Blue Jays for starter Edwin Jackson, relievers Octavio Dotel and Marc Rzepczynski, outfielder Corey Patterson and three players to be named or cash.

Still 10.5 games short of the wild card berth after 130 games on August 25, the Cardinals ended the season on a 22-9 run while capitalizing on the Atlanta Braves' collapse to avoid elimination on the season's final day, capping one of Major League Baseball's epic regular-season comebacks. Dotel and Rzepczynski proved to factor significantly in making up the 10.5 games as they helped stabilize questionable bullpen performance. Dotel posted a 3.28 ERA and struck out 32 of the 96 batters he faced. Rzepczynski posted a 3.97 ERA. Jackson started twelve games for the Cardinals and posted a 3.58 ERA, winning five games and losing two. The 10.5 games-won deficit is also the highest-surmounted at 130 games in MLB history.

2011 postseason
In the postseason––the Cardinals' second appearance during Mozeliak's tenure as GM––Freese set the single postseason RBI record with 21. He also salvaged the Cardinals from elimination in the World Series against the Texas Rangers by driving home the tying run on the final strike in the ninth inning of Game 6 –– which was accomplished again later that game. Tying the score twice on the final strike in one game was the first such occurrence in World Series history. Berkman became the second batter to tie the game on the team's final strike in the ninth inning or later with a two-run single in the tenth. Freese then ended the game in the eleventh with a home run off Mark Lowe. Berkman and Freese became just the third and fourth hitters in World Series history to knock game-tying hits where the alternative was elimination. Driven primarily by the Rasmus and Freese trades and the Berkman acquisition, Mozeliak achieved his first World Series title culminating in a game that "ranks among the greatest games in Fall Classic history" and "one of the greatest thrillers in baseball history."

Albert Pujols' free agency
Following the 2011 World Series, the Cardinals found themselves in the position of having to negotiate to re-sign iconic first baseman Albert Pujols when he filed for free agency on December 1. The Cardinals had offered $198 million over nine years the previous January. After the season concluded, the Cardinals reopened their bid with five years and $130 million. Other teams reportedly pursuing him were the Miami Marlins and two "mystery teams." The Marlins' offers were for nine years, then ten, but at first neither monetary figures were disclosed nor information was available on whether a no-trade clause would be included.

The Cardinals increased their offer to $200 million over ten years, then $220 million; however, the two unidentified teams eclipsed the initial offer. Miami offered $200 million then $225 million. Pujols then signed with one of the two anonymous teams on December 8 which had been revealed through rumors just a few days before –– the Los Angeles Angels of Anaheim –– for $254 million over ten years.

After signing with the Angels, Albert Pujols' wife, Diedre Pujols, commented on a St. Louis radio show that what the Cardinals had offered was an "'insult" and that they were "confused" after being told "'we want you to be a Cardinal for life.'" Even so, Pujols' performance decline started before he became a free agent: in 2012, he finished in career lows in multiple categories, and in 2013, plantar fasciitis cut his season short. Since then, Mozeliak's decision to let Pujols walk has paid off, as with the money he saved by not signing him, he extended ace Adam Wainwright and star catcher Yadier Molina. Also, with the two Compensation Picks the St. Louis Cardinals received from the Angels, they drafted 2013 postseason hero Michael Wacha and a promising young hitter who was the Cardinals' top prospect after 2014 according to MLB.com, Stephen Piscotty.

Farm system turnaround (2012–present)
Despite the Cardinals' major league success in the 21st century spanning well before Mozeliak's tenure as GM –– they have just one losing season and nine playoff appearances since 2000 –– the farm system had lagged behind until more recent seasons. Between 2000 and 2007, the highest rank the farm system garnered was 21st; between 2002 and 2005 it "ranked 30th, 28th, 28th and 30th." After 2011, Baseball America bestowed the Cardinals franchise with their first Organization of the Year award. Seventeen of the 25 players on the 2011 playoff roster were players who had spent their entire careers with the Cardinals. ESPNs Keith Law and Baseball Prospectus also ranked the Cardinals organization #1 for the 2013 season.

After losing shortstop Rafael Furcal to injury in 2012, the Cardinals called up Pete Kozma to replace Furcal. Noted for his defense, Kozma had shown a poor track record in the minor leagues as a hitter, producing a .652 on-base plus slugging percentage (OPS) in 671 minor league games. However, during his major league call-up in 2012, he batted .333 with a .952 OPS in 82 plate appearances. His skillful hitting continued in the playoffs, as he hit an RBI single in Game 5 against the Washington Nationals in the NLDS that ultimately proved to be the game and series winner, allowing the Cardinals to advance to the NLCS. Kozma became the starting shortstop the next season, but could not sustain his improved hitting in the Major Leagues, slumping to a .548 OPS. In the following World Series against the Boston Red Sox, a two-play error contributed to a Red Sox' Game 1 victory on the way to the Red Sox winning the Series.

Adam Wainwright and Allen Craig contracts
On February 14, 2013, the Cardinals extended Mozeliak's contract by three years to end after the 2016 season. Late in spring training 2013, right-handed starting pitcher Adam Wainwright agreed to a five-year, $97.5 million extension that runs through 2018, the richest contract the Cardinals have awarded to a pitcher. That spring, the Cardinals also signed first baseman Allen Craig to a five-year, $32 million contract.

Trade for Peter Bourjos and Jhonny Peralta contract
After making it to the 2013 World Series only to lose to the Boston Red Sox, the Cardinals addressed weaknesses the following offseason at shortstop and center field. First, they traded Freese and relief pitcher Fernando Salas to the Los Angeles Angels of Anaheim for center fielder Peter Bourjos and right fielder Randal Grichuk.

Just two days later, they signed free agent shortstop Jhonny Peralta to a four-year, $53 million contract. The Cardinals still had yet to find consistency at shortstop since the days of Rentería, and Peralta was seen as a player who could bring that consistency. However, the signing drew scrutiny because he had served a 50-game suspension for his connection to the Biogenesis of America scandal earlier in the season.

Fellow players such as Brad Ziegler of the Arizona Diamondbacks publicly complained that the 50-game suspension was not enough of a deterrent, because it appeared to fail to prevent players who violated the collective bargaining agreement's banned substances use policy to receive compensation for their performances equal to those who had not been found to violate the policy. Mozeliak defended the contract, stating that the Cardinals were not self-appointed "morality police". He further explained that "character and makeup are something we weigh into our decision-making. In his case, he admitted what he did, he took responsibility for it. I feel like he has paid for his mistakes, and obviously if he were to make another one, then it would be a huge disappointment."

The Cardinals signed All-Star second baseman Matt Carpenter to a six-year, $52 million extension on March 6, 2014. Included was an option for 2020 worth $18.5 million. The year prior, he led the major leagues in hits, runs scored, and doubles while batting .318 and becoming a regular at a position he had yet to play as professional. Mozeliak cited his work ethic as another factor in the extension.

On April 12, 2014, the Cardinals announced they had extended Mozeliak's contract by two years through the 2018 season. They won the division this season but fell to the Giants in the NLCS.

Reports surfaced on June 16, 2015, that the Federal Bureau of Investigation (FBI) were reviewing an alleged incident involving Cardinals' front office officials hacking into the Houston Astros' database of players, scouting reports and proprietary statistics. It was regarded as the first known case of corporate espionage involving computer network hacking in professional sports. On September 19, 2015, the Cardinals became the first team in MLB to clinch a playoff spot that season. It also extended a franchise record of five consecutive seasons of reaching the postseason, a record which the club had set the previous season.

On June 30, 2017, Mozeliak was promoted to President of Baseball Operations, while Assistant GM Mike Girsch was named the new vice president and general manager of the Cardinals. These promotions came with contract guarantees for both through the 2020 season.

After a three year absence from the postseason, the Cards won the NL Central in 2019 and defeated the Atlanta Braves in a five game NLDS.

Awards and honors
Personal awards
 Andrew "Rube" Foster Award as NL Executive of the Year (2012)
 GIBBY Executive of the Year (2011)
 MLB.com Executive of the Year (2011)

Club distinctions with Mozeliak as general manager (2008–present)
 Baseball America #1 minor league system (2013)
 Baseball Prospectus #1 minor league system (2013)
 ESPN #1 minor league system (2013)
 2× Baseball America's Organization of the Year (2011, 2013)
 2× World Series appearances: 2011 (won), 2013
 5× National League Championship Series (NLCS) appearances: 2011 (won), 2012, 2013 (won), 2014, 2019
 7x National League Division Series (NLDS) appearances: 2009, 2011 (won), 2012 (won), 2013 (won), 2014 (won), 2015, 2019 (won)'''''
 6x National League Central division titles: 2009, 2013, 2014, 2015, 2019, 2022
 4× National League wild card entrant: 2011, 2012, 2020, 2021
 15x regular-season winning percentage ≥ .500 (2008–2022)

Achievements
 Franchise record 5 consecutive seasons with playoff appearance (2011–15)

Personal life and other ventures
Mozeliak, his wife Julie, daughter Allyson and son Will reside in St. Louis. He is the National Trustee for the Foundation Fighting Blindness.

References

External links
 Front Office – St. Louis Cardinals

1969 births
Living people
Colorado Rockies executives
Major League Baseball general managers
St. Louis Cardinals executives
St. Louis Cardinals scouts
University of Colorado Boulder alumni